This is a list of songs which reached number one on the Billboard Mainstream Top 40 (or Pop Songs) chart in 2022.

During 2022, a total of 18 singles hit number-one on the chart.

Chart history

See also 
 2022 in American music

References

External links 
 Current Billboard Pop Songs chart

Billboard charts
Mainstream Top 40 2022
United States Mainstream Top 40